Brook Park may refer to a location in the United States:

 Brook Park, Minnesota
 Brook Park Township, Pine County, Minnesota
 Brook Park, Ohio

See also
 Brooks Park, a softball facility in Pennsylvania